Kurdish Heritage Foundation of America, also known as Kurdish Library and Museum, was a cultural organization based in Brooklyn, New York. It collected items related to Kurdish culture, literature and history. Its library contained around 3,000 volumes on Kurdish-related subjects. 

The museum was focused on Kurdish art and handicrafts. This organization was founded by Vera Beaudin Saeedpour in 1981. She was the widow of Homayoun Saeedpour, a Kurd from Sanandaj, Iran. The Library was established in 1986, and the Museum was opened in 1988.

The library published two scholarly research journals: International Journal of Kurdish Studies and Kurdish Life.

After Vera Beaudin Saeedpour died in 2010, the contents of the museum were donated to Binghamton University.

References

Further reading

External links 
 Kurdish Heritage Foundation of America

 
Museums in Brooklyn
Ethnic museums in New York City
Libraries in Brooklyn
Kurdish-American history
Kurdish organisations
Defunct museums in New York City
Middle Eastern-American culture in New York City
Museums established in 1988
1988 establishments in New York City
Museums disestablished in 2010
2010 disestablishments in New York (state)
Prospect Heights, Brooklyn
History of the Kurdish people